Aleksandar Staliyski is the name of:

 Aleksandar Tsankov Staliyski (1893-1945), Bulgarian Justice minister
 Aleksandar Aleksandrov Staliyski (1925-2004), Bulgarian Defence minister